Georgia Constitution may refer to:
 Constitution of Georgia (U.S. state)
 Constitution of Georgia (country)